The discography of Moroccan-American rapper French Montana consists of four studio albums, twenty-four mixtapes, 39 singles including 45 as featured artist, 32 music videos and 18 promotional singles. 

Since his debut album, his commercial projects all have been released through Bad Boy Records, a label owned by his mentor, Sean Combs. His debut album was released by Interscope Records, as Bad Boy was one of its sub-labels at the time. It was his only album to be co-released Maybach Music Group, which is owned by Rick Ross. His subsequent studio albums were released by Epic Records along with other major Bad Boy releases.

Studio albums

Collaboration albums

Mixtapes

Singles

As lead artist

As featured artist

Promotional singles

Other charted songs

Guest appearances

Music videos

As lead artist

As featured artist

Production discography

Notes

References

Discographies of American artists
Hip hop discographies